The 1874 East Suffolk by-election was fought on 20 March 1874.  The byelection was fought due to the incumbent Conservative MP, Frederick Thellusson, 5th Baron Rendlesham, becoming Lord Commissioner of the Treasury.  It was retained by the incumbent.

References

1874 elections in the United Kingdom
1874 in England
East, 1874
Unopposed ministerial by-elections to the Parliament of the United Kingdom in English constituencies
March 1874 events